The 2010–11 Liga III season was the 55th season of the Liga III, the third tier of the Romanian football league system. The season started on August 27, 2010 and ended on June 3, 2011.

The winners of each series promoted to the 2011–12 Liga II.

The bottom three from each division relegated at the end of the season to the county football leagues (Liga IV). From the 13th placed teams, another three were relegated. To determine this teams, separate standings were computed, using only the games played against clubs ranked 1st through 12th.

League tables

Seria I

Seria II

Seria III

Seria IV

Seria V

Seria VI

See also

 2010–11 Liga I
 2010–11 Liga II
 2010–11 Liga IV

Liga III seasons
3
Romania